Wheels Within Wheels: Autobiography is Irish cyclist and travel writer Dervla Murphy's autobiographical book. It was first published in 1979 by John Murray, and reprinted by Eland Books in 2010 with the subtitle The Makings of a Traveller.

The book describes the first thirty years of Murphy's life, before the journey described in her first book, Full Tilt. Murphy writes:

References

External links
 

Irish autobiographies
1979 non-fiction books
Eland Books books
John Murray (publishing house) books
Books by Dervla Murphy